Lima Kedai (Jawi: ليما كداي) is an area in Iskandar Puteri, Johor Bahru District, Johor, Malaysia. It is located between Skudai and Gelang Patah. Lima Kedai is an important transit town for travelers on the Second Link Expressway.

References 

Iskandar Puteri
Towns in Johor